Richard Kyle (born July 31, 1960) is a former member of the Arizona House of Representatives. He served in the House from January 1997 through January 2001, representing district 6.

References

Republican Party members of the Arizona House of Representatives
1960 births
Living people